SS Sallie S. Cotten (MC contract 1969) was a Liberty ship built in the United States during World War II. She was named after Sallie Southall Cotten, writer and clubwoman living in North Carolina.  After being launched, the Cotten was renamed Ole Bull after the Norwegian violin virtuoso.

The ship was laid down by North Carolina Shipbuilding Company in their Cape Fear River yard on April 13, 1943, and launched on May 7, 1943.  Bull was chartered to the International Freighting Corporation by the War Shipping Administration until October 1946 when she was purchased by the Royal Norwegian government.  The vessel was scrapped in 1967.

References 

Liberty ships
Ships built in Wilmington, North Carolina
1943 ships